There are no official diplomatic relations between Armenia and Saudi Arabia. However, the relationship between the two countries has witnessed significant warming since the 2010s, possibly due to common opposition to increasing Turkish influence.

History

From 1990s to early 2010s
Due to the history of Nagorno-Karabakh conflict, in particular, the First Nagorno-Karabakh War that ended in 1994, Saudi Arabia and Armenia have no formal relations as Saudi Arabia has backed Azerbaijan's position in Karabakh. This issue has remained as Saudi Arabia remains firm on its stance over the Karabakh region as part of Azerbaijan alongside not having established relations.

Since mid-2010s

However, since the rise of Saudi Arabian Crown Prince Mohammad bin Salman and increasing hostility between Saudi Arabia and Turkey, the latter having poor relations with Armenia, the relationship between Saudi Arabia and Armenia has experienced a new level of improvement. Both Saudi Arabia and Armenia share a common sentiment viewing Turkish expansionism under Recep Tayyip Erdoğan as a threat to these nations, with Saudi Arabia recently launched an anti-Turkish boycott, started in 2019 and has been escalated since due to anti-Saudi remarks by the Turkish government; while Armenia has disputes with Turkey over the Armenian genocide and its alliance with Azerbaijan.

In 2019, Saudi Arabia agreed to sponsor a final solution to acknowledge the Armenian genocide in the United States Congress. Saudi Ambassador to the US Princess Reema bint Bandar Al Saud, in her statement, condemned Turkey for its hypocrisies and refusal to acknowledge the genocide. Saudi Arabian ambassador in Lebanon had also paid a visit to Armenian Genocide memorial to demonstrate Saudi solidarity to Armenia.

In September 2018, despite the two countries not having established official relations, Saudi Crown Prince Mohammed bin Salman and Saudi King Salman congratulated Armenia on its independence day, which was considered as a breakthrough. On October 26, 2021, Armenian President Armen Sarkissian arrived in Riyadh, Saudi Arabia on a visit described by the Armenian presidency as historic, the first of its kind for the leaders of the two countries. The President participated in the Future Investment Initiative forum, where he sat next to Crown Prince Mohammed bin Salman.

In addition, during the 2020 Nagorno-Karabakh war, Saudi Arabia, alongside the United Arab Emirates, was thought to be secretly backing Armenia against Azerbaijan . Saudi channel Al Arabiya hosted a special speech delivered by Armenian President Armen Sargsyan condemning Turkey and Azerbaijan and urged international community to prevent Turkey and Azerbaijan from intervening in the conflict together. 

On the other hand, Saudi Arabia has sought to refrain from making direct support for Armenia, instead urging two parties (Armenia and Azerbaijan) to solve the problem, largely due to Saudi Arabia seeing Azerbaijan as a potential partner against Iran even though Saudi Arabia is increasingly hostile to Azerbaijan's ally Turkey.

See also 
 Foreign relations of Armenia
 Foreign relations of Saudi Arabia

References

 
Saudi Arabia
Bilateral relations of Saudi Arabia